The fourth HMS Tobago (K585), ex-Hong Kong, was a  of the United Kingdom which served in the Royal Navy during World War II. She originally was ordered by the United States Navy as the Tacoma-class patrol frigate USS Holmes (PF-81) and was transferred to the Royal Navy prior to completion.

Construction and acquisition
The ship, originally designated a "patrol gunboat," PG-189, was ordered by the United States Maritime Commission under a United States Navy contract as the first USS Holmes. She was reclassified as a "patrol frigate," PF-81, on 15 April 1943 and laid down by the Walsh-Kaiser Company at Providence, Rhode Island, on 17 August 1943. Intended for transfer to the United Kingdom, the ship was first renamed Hong Kong and then Tobago by the British prior to launching and was launched on 27 September 1943, sponsored by Mrs. D. W. Ambridge of Ottawa, Ontario, Canada.

Service history
Transferred to the United Kingdom under Lend-Lease on 12 August 1944, the ship served in the Royal Navy as HMS Tobago (K585) on patrol and escort duty until 1945.

Disposal
The United Kingdom returned Tobago to the U.S. Navy on 13 May 1946. She subsequently was sold to the Boston Metals Company of Baltimore, Maryland, for scrapping, but her scrapping was cancelled and in 1950 she was resold to Khedivial Mail Lines of Alexandria, Egypt, for use as a civilian passenger vessel. She was sunk as a blockship in the Suez Canal in 1956.

Citatioms and references 
Citations

References

NavSource Online: Frigate Photo Archive: HMS Tobago (K 585) ex-Hong Kong ex-Holmes ex-PF-81 ex-PG-189

External links 
Photo gallery of USS Holmes and HMS Tobago

Tacoma-class frigates
Ships built in Providence, Rhode Island
1943 ships
World War II frigates and destroyer escorts of the United States
Colony-class frigates
World War II frigates of the United Kingdom
Shipwrecks of Egypt